Towle is a surname. Notable people with the surname include:

 Andy Towle (born 1967), American blogger
 Arthur Lucan (born Arthur Towle, 1885–1954), English comedy actor
 Charles L. Towle (1913–1990), philatelist of Arizona
 Charlotte Towle (1896–1966), American social worker, academic and writer
 Clifton Cappie Towle (1888–1946), founding member of The Anthropological Society of New South Wales
 Edward Towle Brooks (1830–1897), Quebec lawyer, judge and political figure
 George Makepeace Towle (1841–1893), American lawyer, politician, and author
 John D. Towle (died 1887), American architect
 John R. Towle (1924–1944), United States Army soldier
 Katherine Amelia Towle (1898–1986), first Director of Women Marines
 Kerry Towle (born c. 1974), Canadian politician
 Margaret Elizabeth Ashley-Towle (1902–1985), American archaeologist
 Mark Towle, defendant in the DC Comics v Mark Towle copyright case
 Max Towle (1889–1969), American football player and coach
 Philip Towle, British academic
 Steve Towle (born 1953), former American football linebacker
 Thomas Towle (1887–1983), American aircraft designer in charge of developing the Ford Trimotor
 Thomas Graham Towle, Australian convicted for the Cardross road crash
 Thurston Towle (1905–1960), American football player
 Tony Towle (born 1939), American poet